Sunbirds and spiderhunters make up the family Nectariniidae of passerine birds. They are small, slender passerines from the Old World, usually with downward-curved bills. Many are brightly coloured, often with iridescent feathers, particularly in the males. Many species also have especially long tail feathers. Their range extends through most of Africa to the Middle East, South Asia, South-east Asia and southern China, to Indonesia, New Guinea and northern Australia. Species diversity is highest in equatorial regions.

There are 145 species in 16 genera.  Most sunbirds feed largely on nectar, but will also eat insects and spiders, especially when feeding their young. Flowers that prevent access to their nectar because of their shape (for example, very long and narrow flowers) are simply punctured at the base near the nectaries, from which the birds sip the nectar. Fruit is also part of the diet of some species. Their flight is fast and direct, thanks to their short wings.

The sunbirds have counterparts in two very distantly related groups: the hummingbirds of the Americas and the honeyeaters of Australia. The resemblances are due to convergent evolution brought about by a similar nectar-feeding lifestyle. Some sunbird species can take nectar by hovering like a hummingbird, but they usually perch to feed.

Description
The family ranges in size from the 5-gram black-bellied sunbird to the spectacled spiderhunter, at about 45 grams. Like the hummingbirds, sunbirds are strongly sexually dimorphic, with the males usually brilliantly plumaged in iridescent colours. In addition to this the tails of many species are longer in the males, and overall the males are larger. Sunbirds have long thin down-curved bills and brush-tipped tubular tongues, both adaptations to their nectar feeding.  The spiderhunters, of the genus Arachnothera, are distinct in appearance from the other members of the family. They are typically larger than the other sunbirds, with drab brown plumage that is the same for both sexes, and long, down-curved beaks.

In metabolic behaviour similar to that of Andes hummingbirds, species of sunbirds that live at high altitudes or latitudes will enter torpor while roosting at night, lowering their body temperature and entering a state of low activity and responsiveness.

The moulting regimes of sunbirds are complex, being different in different species. Many species have no eclipse plumage, but do have juvenile plumage. Some species do show duller plumage in the off-season. In the dry months of June−August, male copper sunbirds and variable sunbirds lose much of their metallic sheen. In some instances different populations of the same species can display variation in different molting regimes.

Distribution and habitat
Sunbirds are a tropical Old World family, with representatives in Africa, Asia and Australasia. In Africa they are found mostly in sub-Saharan Africa and Madagascar but are also distributed in Egypt. In Asia the group occurs along the coasts of the Red Sea as far north as Israel, and along the Mediterranean as far north as Beirut, with a gap in their distribution across inland Syria and Iraq, and resuming in Iran, from where the group occurs continuously as far as southern China and Indonesia. In Australasia the family occurs in New Guinea, north eastern Australia and the Solomon Islands.  They are generally not found on oceanic islands, with the exception of the Seychelles. The greatest variety of species is found in Africa, where the group probably arose. Most species are sedentary or short-distance seasonal migrants. Sunbirds occur over the entire family's range, whereas the spiderhunters are restricted to Asia.

The sunbirds and spiderhunters occupy a wide range of habitats, with a majority of species being found in primary rainforest, but other habitats used by the family including disturbed secondary forest, open woodland, open scrub and savannah, coastal scrub and alpine forest. Some species have readily adapted to human modified landscapes such as plantations, gardens and agricultural land. Many species are able to occupy a wide range of habitats from sea level to 4900 m.

Behaviour and ecology
Sunbird are active diurnal birds that generally occur in pairs or occasionally in small family groups. A few species occasionally gather in larger groups, and sunbird will join with other birds to mob potential predators, although sunbirds will also aggressively target other species, even if they are not predators, when defending their territories.

Breeding

Sunbirds that breed outside of the equatorial regions are mostly seasonal breeders, with the majority of them breeding in the wet season. This timing reflects the increased availability of insect prey for the growing young. Where species, like the buff-throated sunbird, breed in the dry season, it is thought to be associated with the flowering of favoured food plants. Species of sunbird in the equatorial areas breed throughout the year. They are generally monogamous and often territorial, although a few species of sunbirds have lekking behaviour.
The nests of sunbirds are generally purse-shaped, enclosed, suspended from thin branches with generous use of spiderweb. The nests of the spiderhunters are different, both from the sunbirds and in some cases from each other. Some, like the little spiderhunter, are small woven cups attached to the underside of large leaves; that of the yellow-eared spiderhunter is similarly attached but is a long tube. The nests of spiderhunters are inconspicuous, in contrast to those of the other sunbirds which are more visible. In most species the female alone constructs the nest. Up to four eggs are laid.  The female builds the nest and incubates the eggs alone, although the male assists in rearing the nestlings. In the spiderhunters both sexes help to incubate the eggs. The nests of sunbirds and spiderhunters are often targeted by brood parasites such as cuckoos and honeyguides.

Pollination 

As nectar is a primary food source for sunbirds, they are important pollinators in African ecosystems. Sunbird-pollinated flowers are typically long, tubular, and red-to-orange in colour, showing convergent evolution with many hummingbird-pollinated flowers in the Americas. A key difference is that sunbirds cannot hover, so sunbird-pollinated flowers and inflorescences are typically sturdier than hummingbird-pollinated flowers, with an appropriate landing spot from which the bird can feed. Sunbirds are critical pollinators for many iconic African plants, including proteas, aloes, Erica, Erythrina coral trees, and bird-of-paradise flowers. Specialization on sunbirds vs other pollinators is thought to have contributed to plant speciation, including the exceptionally high flora diversity in southern Africa.

Relationship with humans
Overall the family has fared better than many others, with only seven species considered to be threatened with extinction. Most species are fairly resistant to changes in habitat, and while attractive the family is not sought after by the cagebird trade, as they have what is considered an unpleasant song and are tricky to keep alive. Sunbirds are considered attractive birds and readily enter gardens where flowering plants are planted to attract them. There are a few negative interactions, for example the scarlet-chested sunbird is considered a pest in cocoa plantations as it spreads parasitic mistletoes.

List of genera
The family contains 146 species divided into 16 genera: For more detail, see list of sunbird species.

References

External links
Sunbird videos on the Internet Bird Collection

Nectariniidae
Taxa named by Nicholas Aylward Vigors